Multan is on third rank of most numbers of flyovers in a city in Pakistan. In duration of 2009 and 2012, most of new flyovers was constructed in Multan including Yousuf Raza Gillani Flyover, Chowk Kumharanwala Level II Flyover and Nishtar Chowk Flyover.

Flyovers in Multan 
This is a list of flyovers in Multan.

See also 
 List of flyovers in Pakistan
 List of places in Multan

Multan-related lists